Hypatima mangiferae is a moth in the family Gelechiidae. It was described by Sattler in 1989. It is found in Kenya.

The larvae feed on Mangifera indica.

References

Endemic moths of Kenya
Hypatima
Moths described in 1989